The Seasons (Vremena goda; also ) is an allegorical ballet in one act, four scenes, by the choreographer Marius Petipa, with music by Alexander Glazunov, his Op. 67. The work was composed in 1899 and first performed by the Imperial Ballet in 1900 in St. Petersburg, Russia.

History

Composition history
The score for Marius Petipa's Les Saisons (The Seasons) was originally intended to have been composed by the Italian composer and conductor Riccardo Drigo, who was Glazunov's colleague and close friend. Since 1886, Drigo held the posts of director of music and chef d’orchestre to the Ballet of the St. Petersburg Imperial Theatres, while also serving as conductor for performances of the Italian operas in the repertory of the Imperial Opera. Petipa's Les Millions d’Arlequin (also known as Harlequinade) was also in its preliminary stages at the same time as Les Saisons, and was originally intended to have had a score supplied by Glazunov. Since Drigo and Glazunov had an affinity towards each other's assigned ballet, the two composers agreed that Glazunov would compose Les Saisons and that Drigo would compose Les Millions d’Arlequin.

Les Saisons premiered three days later. For both performances the whole of the Imperial court was in attendance.

In 1907, Nikolai Legat staged a revival of Les Saisons at the Imperial Mariinsky Theatre. This production was performed on occasion by the Imperial Ballet after the Russian Revolution, being performed for the last time in 1927.

Les Saisons lived on in an abridged edition in the repertory of Anna Pavlova's touring company.

Performance history
St. Petersburg premiere (World Premiere)

Date: 
Place: Imperial Theatre of the Hermitage, Winter Palace, St. Petersburg
Balletmaster: Marius Petipa
Conductor: Riccardo Drigo
Scene designer: Pyotr Lambin
Costume designer: Yevgeni Ponomaryov

Other notable productions

1900, February 13, St. Petersburg, Imperial Mariinsky Theatre, same ensemble as the premiere 
1907, St. Petersburg, Mariinsky Theatre, balletmaster Nikolay Legat, conducted by Drigo, décor by Lambin, costumes by Aleksandr Golovin.

Roles and original cast

Publication history
1901, M.P. Belyayev, Leipzig

Instrumentation
Woodwinds: 1 piccolo, 2 flutes, 2 oboes (2nd doubling english horn in F), 2 clarinets in B-flat and A, 2 bassoons

Brass: 4 french horns in F, 2 trumpets in B-flat, 3 trombones, tuba

Percussion: timpani, triangle, tambourine, military drum, cymbal, bass drum, glockenspiel

Keyboard: celesta, pianino (upright piano)

Strings: harp, 1st and 2nd violins, violas, cellos, contrabass

Synopsis 

Tableau 1 — A winter landscape

Winter is surrounded by his companions: Hoar-frost, Ice, Hail and Snow, who amuse themselves with a band of snowflakes. Two gnomes enter, and soon light a fire that causes all assembled to vanish.

Tableau 2 — A landscape covered with flowers

Spring dances with Zephyr, flower fairies, and enchanted birds. Upon feeling the heat of the sun, the assembly takes flight.

Tableau 3 — A landscape of flowing fields of wheat

Cornflowers and poppies revel in the light and warmth of the sun. They take rest after their exertion. Now naiads appear, who bring water to refresh the growth, and the Spirit of Corn dances in thanksgiving. Satyrs and fauns enter playing their pipes, and attempt to carry off the Spirit of the Corn, but she is rescued by the wind of Zephyr.

Tableau 4 — A landscape in Autumn

The Seasons take part in a glorious dance (the well-known "autumn bacchanale") while leaves from autumn trees rain upon their merriment.

Apotheosis — The Sable sky

Constellations of stars sparkle above the earth.

Résumé of dances and the mise-en-scène

List of the numbers comprising The Seasons taken from the Yearbook of the Imperial Theatres, 1899-1900, being the original titles of the dances and mise en scène as originally staged.

No.01 Prélude
Tableau I — L’Hiver (winter)

No.02 Scène de l’Hiver
No.03 Variation du givre (frost)
No.04 Variation de la glace (ice)
No.05 Variation de la grêle (hail)
No.06 Variation de la neige (snow)
No.07 Coda

Tableau II — Le Printemps (spring)

No.08 Entrée de Printemps, Zéphyre, les Fées des fleurs, les oiseaux et les fleurs

Tableau III — L’Été (summer)

No.09 Scène de l’Été
No.10 Valse des bleuets et des pavots (Waltz of the Cornflowers and Poppies)
No.11 La Barcarolle – Entrée des naïades, le satyres et des faunes
No.12 Variation de l’Esprit du maïs
No.13 Coda

Tableau IV — L’Automne (fall)

No.14 Grande bacchanale des saisons—
a. Entrée des saisons
b. L’Hiver
c. Le Printemps
d. Bacchanale
e. L’Été

No.15 Petit Adagio
No.16 Variation du Satyre
No.17 Coda générale

Apotheosis
No.18 Apothéose: La Révélation des étoiles

Discography
1929, Aleksandr Glazunov, unknown orchestra
1953, Roger Désormière, Orchestre National de France
1956, Albert Wolff, Paris Conservatoire Orchestra
1966, Ernest Ansermet, Suisse Romande Orchestra
196?, Konstantin Ivanov, USSR Symphony Orchestra
196?, Robert Irving, Concert Arts Orchestra
1978, Yevgeny Svetlanov, Philharmonia Orchestra
1987, Neeme Järvi, Scottish National Orchestra
1989, Vladimir Ashkenazy, Royal Philharmonic Orchestra
1993, Edo de Waart, Minnesota Orchestra
1987, Ondrej Lenard, Czecho-Slovak Radio Symphony Orchestra
2004, José Serebrier, Royal Scottish National Orchestra

Uses in popular culture
Part of the Adagio from Autumn was chosen by Guy Mauffette as the musical theme for the long-running Radio-Canada soap opera Un homme et son péché (1939–1962) and its later adaptation for television, Les Belles Histoires des pays d'en haut (1956–1970).
The Autumn Bacchanale is used as the introductory music to BBC TV's annual Richard Dimbleby Lectures (1972–). 
Excerpts from the ballet were heard on a recording featuring Don Wilson narrating the story of Ceres and Proserpina (here called Proserpine), with the music, played by the Continental Symphony Orchestra, serving as accompaniment. This recording was part of an LP issued by Capitol Records entitled Classics for Children.

See also
 List of ballets by title

External links
 
 YouTube clip of the Autumn variation

1900 ballet premieres
Ballets by Alexander Glazunov
Ballets by Marius Petipa
Ballets designed by Alexander Golovin
1899 compositions
Ballets premiered at the Hermitage Theatre